The Dodsal Group is a diversified multinational conglomerate headquartered in Dubai, United Arab Emirates. It operates in the areas of trading and distribution; engineering, procurement and construction; exploration and production; casual dining restaurants; and manufacturing.

It is wholly owned by Rajen A. Kilachand, the Chairman and President of the group.

History
The Dodsal Group was founded in Mumbai, India, in 1938 by the Nandlal Kilachand family as a trading company in partnership with a British trading company (DODWEL) and Karsa Salem. After the Kilachand family acquired Dodsal from the other partners and Rajen Kilachand took over the company, he streamlined Dodsal's various businesses to form the Dodsal Group. The group moved its headquarters from Mumbai to Dubai in 2003.

Business Divisions
The Dodsal Group operates five main business divisions:

Trading and Distribution
The trading and distribution arm operates under Dodsal Enterprises Pvt. Ltd, as the Agency division and markets and distributes chemical and engineering products in India for more than 15 companies from 10 countries spanning North America, Europe and Asia

Engineering, Procurement and Construction
The Dodsal Group has successfully implemented projects in over 22 countries in the Middle East, Europe, Africa, the Indian Subcontinent and South-East Asia. Dodsal Engineering and Construction Pte. Limited, the holding company for the Group's Engineering and Construction activities also carries out infrastructure development and management projects and has already implemented on a finance, build, operate and transfer basis, pipeline projects in India and North Africa.

Dodsal Group is one of the three companies in the Italian-led consortium that was awarded a US$900 million contract by the state-backed railway company, Etihad Rail, to build the first stage of the United Arab Emirates' railway network.

Exploration and Production
The group's latest venture, Dodsal Resources FZCO, is the holding company for the group's hydrocarbon exploration, mining and production activities. It has successfully secured concessions in nations in the African Great Lakes region. The group's venture into exploration and production has led to the discovery of deposits of multi-metals in Tanzania, and the group is also expanding its hydrocarbon search for oil and natural gas and in the energy sector.

Casual Dining Restaurants
Dodsal Enterprises Pvt. Ltd. used to own 78 Pizza Hut and KFC outlets, with franchise rights from Yum! Brands Inc., in major metropolitan cities in India.

Manufacturing
Dodsal Group and Atomenergomash (AEM), a Russian heavy equipment engineering company, signed a Memorandum of Understanding (MOU) to co-operate in the fields of manufacture and supply of power equipment for nuclear, thermal and oil and gas projects in India. An initial investment in the range of US$150 million was put forth, targeting start-up of commercial production by the first quarter of 2013.

Acquisitions
Dodsal Group acquired the Chennai-based company AE&E I.D.E.A. (India) Private Limited on 7 March 2011.

References

External links
 

Conglomerate companies of the United Arab Emirates
Companies based in Dubai